Andrew Gibson (1 July 1890 – 20 June 1962) was a Scottish professional footballer who played as an inside forward in the 1910s.

Playing career
Born in Glasgow he was playing for Strathclyde and was attracting the attention of both Celtic and  Rangers when he was signed in May 1911 by Southern League Southampton, along with teammate Jim McAlpine. Southampton's new manager  George Swift claimed that Gibson was "the best forward he had seen and would be a thousand pounds man". Swift was Southampton's first appointment as manager and promptly embarked on a spending spree, signing eleven players in six weeks.

He made his debut on 2 September 1911 at home to Millwall. Despite scoring twice in a 3–2 victory over Leyton on 28 October he failed to live up to Swift's high expectations. In March 1912 Gibson was suspended (along with Henry Hamilton) for a serious breach of club discipline, as a result of which he was placed on the transfer list. He never appeared for the first team again and, after two trial matches for Celtic, he joined Leeds City in September 1912.

At Leeds he made a handful of appearances in the Second Division before retiring.

References

1890 births
1962 deaths
Footballers from Glasgow
Scottish footballers
Southampton F.C. players
Celtic F.C. players
Leeds City F.C. players
Southern Football League players
English Football League players
Association football forwards
Scottish Junior Football Association players
People from Dennistoun
Strathclyde F.C. players